Astudillo is a Spanish municipality in the autonomous community of Castilla y León belonging to the province of Palencia.

Toponym 
The name Astudillo comes from Roman times, specifically from Tito Estatilio Tauro (Titus Statilius Taurus), the Roman general whose legions had their field operations in this Vaccaei region around the year 29 BC.

According to historical records, the name evolved from Ancient Latin in the times of Augustus to modern Castilian: Statilium, Stutilium, Stitellum, Stutellium, Stutiellum, Stutiello, Studellum, Astutello, Astodello, Estodello, Estudillo, Astudil and Astudillo.

STUTILIUM can be found in the motto of the official Coat of Arms of the municipality of Astudillo.

History 

Astudillo has ancient origins, Roman remains having been found within its surroundings. In the Middle and modern ages it was involved in textile production.
It was declared a Historic-Artistic Site in 1995. In the municipality there are several churches, the Castle of La Mota and the Convent of Santa Clara. The origins of Astudillo are prehistoric, having been located within its area several settlements from the Bronze Age and Iron Age.  Astudillo and the region were already occupied in Roman times.

In the 11th century, Astudillo was already head of Alfoz, so the town was a walled place from early medieval times, you can still see one of the six gates it had, the gate of San Martin, of the others only remains their memory and their names: Revilla, Santa Eugenia, San Pedro, Santa Clara and Santoyo. In the middle of the twelfth century, King Alfonso VII, granted privileges to the knights of Astudillo consisting in a wide range of exemptions and freedoms.

In the thirteenth century, King Ferdinand III of León & Castile, ratified the charter of the town and extended with rights of merchandise, making it an important stronghold.

Throughout history several queens boasted the lordship of the town. In the twelfth century, it was Eleanor of England, Queen of Castile, wife of Alfonso VIII of Castile. During the thirteenth century, it was the lordship of his daughter Berenguela, and later of Violant of Aragon, wife of Alfonso X the Wise . In the 14th century, it was the lordship of María de Molina, who stifled the attempt to occupy the village by the rebel Juan Núñez de Lara. King Peter of Castile and his lover, María de Padilla,  who seems to have been born in the town, made Astudillo their habitual residence, having there the king's palace and the queen without a crown. In 1353, Maria de Padilla founded the Convent of Santa Clara, which can still be admired today.
Beatrice, daughter of María de Padilla and the king, was the lady of the town. Juan II of Castile established his chancellery in Astudillo. Later the town passesd to the lordship of Ruy Díaz de Mendoza whose heirs would be counts of Castrojeriz. In 1520, the town of Astudillo adheres to the communal uprising, joining the Junta de Burgos.

As a single town, Astudillo was one of the fourteen villages that made up the Castrojeriz district, which formed the Burgos commune, in the period between 1785 and 1833. In the 1787 Floridablanca Census, Astudillos fell under the ordinary jurisdiction of the Mayoralty lordship.

Astudillo was head of the judicial district from 1834 until the 1970s.

Politics

Demography

Population

Economy 
Astudillo's main activity include agriculture, the food industry and electricity production. There are several wind farms around the village, along with a 1 MW photovoltaic system and some other smaller ones.

Famous residents 
Pedro I de Castilla, King of Castile.

María de Padilla.

Juan de Tapia, guerrilla fighter.
César Arconada, writer and journalist born in Palacios del Alcor.
Marcelino García Velasco, poet and academian of the Institución Tello Téllez de Meneses born in the capital of Palencia, but spent his childhood in Astudillo.
Carlos Bustillo, journalist.
Oscar Husillos, athlete.

References

Bibliography 
 

auto

Municipalities in the Province of Palencia